The women's giant slalom at the 1999 Asian Winter Games was held on 3 February 1999 at the Yongpyong Resort in South Korea.

Schedule
All times are Korea Standard Time (UTC+09:00)

Results
Legend
DNF1 — Did not finish run 1
DNF2 — Did not finish run 2
DNS1 — Did not start run 1

References

Results

External links
Schedule

Women giant slalom